The Oteros River is a river of northwestern Mexico. It is a tributary of the Chínipas River, which is part of the Fuerte River system. It originates in the Sierra Madre Occidental, and joins the Chínipas in a dramatic canyon.

See also
List of rivers of Mexico

References
Atlas of Mexico, 1975 (https://www.webcitation.org/689BebJNR?url=http://www.lib.utexas.edu/maps/atlas_mexico/river_basins.jpg).
The Prentice Hall American World Atlas, 1984.
Rand McNally, The New International Atlas, 1993.

Rivers of Mexico
Rivers of the Sierra Madre Occidental